Rosalvo Ramos (6 June 1914 – 13 July 1966) was a Brazilian sprinter. He competed in the men's 200 metres at the 1948 Summer Olympics.

Competition record

References

External links
 

1914 births
1966 deaths
Athletes (track and field) at the 1948 Summer Olympics
Brazilian male sprinters
Olympic athletes of Brazil
Place of birth missing
20th-century Brazilian people